A spelling bee is a competition in which contestants are asked to spell a broad selection of words, usually with a varying degree of difficulty. To compete, contestants must memorize the spellings of words as written in dictionaries, and recite them accordingly.

The concept is thought to have originated in the United States, and spelling bee events, along with variants, are now also held in some other countries around the world.

Etymology
Historically the word bee has been used to describe a get-together for communal work, like a husking bee, a quilting bee, or an apple bee. According to etymological research recorded in dictionaries, the word bee probably comes from dialectal been or bean (meaning "help given by neighbors"), which came from Middle English bene (meaning "prayer", "boon" and "extra service by a tenant to his lord").

History

The earliest known evidence of the phrase spelling bee in print dates back to 1850, although an earlier name, spelling match, has been traced back to 1808.  A key impetus for the contests was Noah Webster's spelling books. First published in 1786 and known colloquially as "The Blue-backed Speller," Webster's spelling books were an essential part of the curriculum of all elementary school children in the United States for five generations. Now the key reference for the contests is Webster's Third New International Dictionary.

Spelling bees became widespread across the United States during the 1800s, as a way to motivate students to learn standardized spelling. These spelling bees were usually held within individual schools and towns, and were not nationally organized. In 1908, the NEA held what it called the "first national spelling bee" at its convention in Cleveland. Marie Bolden, a black girl from Cleveland, was named champion.

The annual United States National Spelling Bee was started in 1925 by The Courier-Journal, the newspaper of Louisville, Kentucky.  The winner was Frank Neuhauser, who won the 1st National Spelling Bee in Washington, D.C. in 1925 at the age of eleven.

In 1941, the Scripps Howard News Service acquired sponsorship of the program, and the name changed to the Scripps Howard National Spelling Bee.  Later, the name was shortened to the Scripps National Spelling Bee. Besides competitors from the 50 U.S. states, several come from Canada, the Bahamas, New Zealand and European countries.

In the United States, spelling bees are annually held from local levels up to the level of the Scripps National Spelling Bee which awards a cash prize to the winner. The National Spelling Bee is sponsored by English-language newspapers and educational foundations; it is also broadcast on ESPN. Since 2006, the National Spelling Bee's championship rounds have been broadcast on ABC live. In 2005, contestants came from the Bahamas, Jamaica, Guam, the U.S. Virgin Islands, American Samoa, Canada, New Zealand, Puerto Rico and a German military base, as well as the United States. This was the first year that spellers from Canada and New Zealand attended the competition. The final authority for words is the Webster's Third New International Dictionary. The annual study list is available from Scripps, either online or in print.

The National Senior Spelling Bee started in Cheyenne, Wyoming in 1996. Sponsored by the Wyoming AARP, it is open to contestants 50 and older. Maria Dawson is the only contestant to ever win two back-to-back titles at the National Senior Spelling Bee.

The South Asian Spelling Bee is another spelling bee platform in the US. This annual contest takes place across the US each summer in search of the next South Asian-American spelling champ between the ages of 8 and 14 years old. Launched in 2008, the South Asian Spelling Bee toured 10 US cities in 2011 and is broadcast globally via the satellite channel, Sony Entertainment Television Asia.

While most countries and continents have their own Spelling Bees, there are few global Spelling Bees too like ISB Spelling Bee International which has participation from across the world. 

Holding spelling bees in English, with its irregular spelling, makes more sense than in languages that have much more familiar spelling. Some languages, like Hindi, are based fully on phonetics and have regular spellings; and therefore, there are very few spelling bees in these languages.

In English

Africa
In Africa, a spelling bee is organized by the African Spelling Bee, which holds an Annual Spelling Bee contest for children between the age of 6 and 16 across the continent. The first competition took place in July 2016, bringing together nine different countries.

There are several countries that run their own national spelling bees, including Uganda which holds the National Spelling Bee organized by enjuba in 10 different languages, including 8 local languages, sign language and English.

In Ghana, The Spelling Bee Ghana is organized annually, with the winners being flown to US to represent Ghana at the Scripps National Spelling Bee.

Nigeria's spelling bee is called the Nigeria Spelling Bee, and is organized by the Bee Spelling Competition Initiative in states across the federation of Nigeria.

Botswana, Nigeria, Kenya, South Africa, Ethiopia, Lesotho, Zimbabwe, Malawi, and Rwanda are also part of the African Spelling Bee, with the number of countries still growing.

Asia

In Asia, a spelling bee is being conducted up to the international level by MaRRS Spelling Bee. The competition involves learning the correct spelling of words, their use in sentences and in multiple contexts. Currently, it is being held in India, Abu Dhabi, Ajman, Bahrain, Dubai, Fujairah, Ras al Khaimah, Sharjah, and Umm-Al-Quwain.

In Bahrain, an annual spelling bee contest named Spellbound Bahrain is conducted for the school children by KEEN4, an association of Kerala Engineers.

In Malaysia, the annual NST-RHB Spell-it-Right Challenge is open to primary and secondary school students under the Malaysian education syllabus. The competition is carried out in three rounds: the Preliminary Challenge, State Challenge and National Challenge. The preliminary challenge is a written spelling test, from which the top 100 spellers will be chosen to compete in the State Challenge, where the competition is carried out orally. The 1st prize winner from this stage will then represent their states to compete for the title of National Spell-it-Right Champion in the National Challenge.

In Taiwan, the National Spelling Bee Championship is a contest held by Bugstation.tv for young English learners. Thousands of young applicants join this contest each year.

The annual Asia Spelling Cup is held in different cities throughout Asia, and uses mobile pre-selection testing to identify finalists.

Australia 
In Western Australia, a spelling bee is held by the State Library Foundation of Western Australia, for children in school years 5, 6, 7 and 8. The early stages of the competition are held online, and the final spell-off in front of a live audience. Two major prizes are awarded: one for a Junior Winner (Years 5-6) and the other for a Senior Winner (Years 7-8).  Further prizes are given to the teacher and school class of each major prize winner, and to the most improved speller each week.

Bangladesh 
Starting in 2012, Bangladesh's English daily newspaper, The Daily Star and e-Learning portal Champs21.com have been organizing a televised spelling bee on Channel i for the students of class six to ten from Bengali and English medium backgrounds, who compete through their schools and the Champs21 website. The spelling bee team visits 7 divisional cities (Dhaka, Chittagong, Sylhet, Rangpur, Rajshahi, Khulna & Barisal) to test top 1% speller and top 96 speller of the season participate in the television show. The competition is the first such arrangement in Bangladesh. The champion is rewarded with a trip to Washington, DC. The winners of season 2 met the honorable president of the People's Republic of Bangladesh Advocate Abdul Hamid. The fourth season was held in 2016.

Canada 
The Postmedia Canspell National Spelling Bee is a Scripps affiliated Canadian spelling bee held annually nationwide in Canada since 2005. The bee is affiliated with the United States-based Scripps National Spelling Bee and uses similar rules and word lists, and competes in all 10 Canadian provinces to provide a Canadian National Champion for the penultimate Scripps competition.

Another organization is the Spelling Bee of Canada, which started in 1987 in Toronto, Ontario, and celebrated its 25th anniversary by hosting a Canadian Invitational Bee in 2012, as well as organizing Provincial Bees across Canada, and the world.

India 
The India Spelling Bee is held for school students across the country, featuring school-level, state and region-level, and national-level competitions.

Spelling bees in India have seen increasing interest and participation from schools across the country, including rural and suburban areas. This has been further fueled by the prevalence of Indian and Indian-American champions in the Scripps National Spelling Bee in the United States.

Kuwait 
In the school year 2008–2009, Mrs. Wijdan Alawadhi (senior teacher) and Mrs. Mona Yehia (teacher of English) started the spelling bee contest in Mubarak al-Kabir Educational Area (one of the biggest Kuwaiti Governorates). They started the contest as an experiment in their school (Thabet Bin Zaid Primary School for Boys) with the fourth and fifth grades. It was a successful experiment which was faced with a lot of appreciation from Mrs. Aisha Al Awadhi, ELT Senior Supervisor of English Language supervision. Then they decided to hold the competition among the whole educational area (Mubarak Al-Kabeer Educational area). In 2010–2011, the contest was held with 27 schools (12 schools for boys and 15 for girls – around 2700 pupils). Each school nominated a pupil from the fifth grade to participate.

In 2012–2013, 30 schools participated. All the 30 pupils participated anxiously to win the competition with 200 words. It becomes officially an authorized contest in Mubarak Al-Kabeer Educational Area (Kuwaiti Spelling Bee) in Kuwait. In the school year 2013–2014 the competition was held in Al-Imam Al-Shafie primary school for boys with 31 schools and the words list contained 260 words.

In 2014–2015 with the patronage of Mr. Talaq Al-Hiem the director of Mubarak Al-Kabeer Educational Area the competition held with the participation of 33 schools (16 girls, 15 boys and 2 LD) in Sabah AL-Salem Primary school with the help of its principal Mrs. Amira Baqer. Mrs. Aisha Al-Awadhi and the success of the competition convinced the ELT General supervision to decide the competition as Kuwait National Spelling Bee for the coming year 2015–2016.

Nigeria 
The Nigeria Spelling Bee is organized in across states of the federation with national finalists drawn after qualifying from their respective states and either of the six geo-political zones of the country.

The Nigeria Spelling Bee which is the widest spelling bee competition in the country has so far been conducted in more than 25 states across Nigeria by the organizers (Bee Spelling Competition Initiative) which has been endorsed by the Federal Ministry of Education, Ministry of Culture and the state ministries of education.

Winners of the Nigeria Spelling Bee competition win up to ₦1,000,000 in scholarship and participate in the annual African Spelling Bee which is a continental event organized by the African Spelling Bee Consortium as the official Nigerian delegates.

The competition is for students in any registered school in Nigeria from the ages of 9 years to 16 years who have to register on the competition's website.

Apart from the National spelling bee that has representatives across the states in the country, there is another spelling bee that commenced during while Asiwaju Bola Ahmed Tinubu was the governor of Lagos State. 
This is referring to the New Era Foundation spelling Bee, an annual event in Lagos State that had its first outing in 2001.The spelling bee competition is held among all public primary and secondary school in Lagos State  with the winner and runner-ups of the secondary school category carting away prizes ranging from cash, a trip to Finland and the most outstanding one being the opportunity for the overall winner to serve as one-day governor of the state alongside runner-ups as cabinet members. The spelling bee competition has till date produced 20 one-day governors with the year 2020 winner being a female student from Angus Memorial Senior High School, Shomolu Lagos - Miss Jemimah Marcus.

Nepal
In 2010, a spelling bee was held for the first time in Nepal organized by Rotaract Club of Charumati. Benish Shrestha, Grade 10, Galaxy Public School came first; Bibek Rauniyar, Grade 10, Gillette International Boarding School came second; and Arnav Singh from Grade 9 Little Angels School secured third position.

Now Spelling Bee-Nepal is being organized by Evention Master.

Pakistan
In Pakistan, the spelling bee competition is promoted by the daily newspaper Dawn, and it takes place every year in October. There are three stages: district, regional and national. National is held in Islamabad. Dawn Spelling Bee is conducted in three stages. District and pool rounds are the first stage of the competition which are held across the districts and cities all across Pakistan. District champions compete in the Regional Championships which are held in 3 regions: Karachi, Lahore, and Islamabad. Three regional winners from each group consisting of the regional champion, first runner up and second runner up compete in the national finals in Islamabad. Students from Karachi Grammar School, EMS High School, Beaconhouse School System, and Lahore Grammar School have won the competition few times.

United Arab Emirates
Sylvan Learning Center, a supplemental education organization from the United States, has organized an annual competition for Dubai, Abu Dhabi and Sharjah-area schools.  The Sylvan Spelling Challenge is held annually in December and February for students in grades 3–8.  The Sylvan competition expects to attract nearly 1,000 participants from 30 schools in its inaugural year.

Abu Dhabi University sponsors the largest spelling bee in the United Arab Emirates, attracting students from both public and private institutions for the past three years. The Abu Dhabi University Spelling Bee is heralded as the most challenging and well-known spelling competition in the United Arab Emirates.council.

Saudi Arabia
 
The English Language Department in Jeddah conducted a spelling bee competition, Spell Saudia, in 2017 and 2018. The competition has three rounds:
Round One: held at the educational offices level and the best 3 spellers from each group are nominated to round 2. 
Round Two:18 spellers from each stage compete against each other and the best six spellers are nominated for the final round which takes place at the ELDJ Closing Ceremony at the end of the academic year.

Spanish-speaking countries in the Americas 
Different companies/schools organize and participate in different, independent spelling bees, but the largest company in Latin America to organize annual international spelling bees since 2015 is Advanced Methods Corporation (Amco), a U.S. based company that promotes learning English as a second language. Schools from Mexico, Guatemala, Costa Rica, Chile, Honduras, and El Salvador enrolled to the Amco system are eligible to participate in the annual Amco Spelling Bee, consisting of 3 stages: school (selection of students to participate in the regional, repeats with the next stages), regional, and international. The international one is always set in Guadalajara, Jalisco, in Expo Guadalajara, and is almost always held in the last days of May or beginnings of June.

United Kingdom
In 1876 there were newspaper reports of spelling bees in a number of towns in the United Kingdom. Since 2009, The Times newspaper has run a spelling bee for schools: The Times Spelling Bee.

United States

Serious spelling bee competitors in the United States will study affixes and etymologies, and often foreign languages from which English draws, in order to spell challenging words. Several preparatory materials have been published, including some in connection with the Scripps National Spelling Bee and those created by independent organizations not related to Scripps.

For the first several decades of publication, the Scripps annual study booklet was named Words of the Champions, which offered 3,000 words in a list separated into beginning, intermediate & expert groupings. In the mid-1990s the annual study list changed to Paideia (from the Greek word meaning education and culture), which ultimately contained more than 4,100 words, then again in 2006 to the shorter list, entitled Spell It!, the 2009 edition having 1155 words (911 basic words and 244 challenge words).

The Consolidated Word List, also published by Scripps and available on the National Spelling Bee website, consists of all words used in the National Bee as far back as 1950. It is organized into three sections: Words Appearing Infrequently, Words Appearing with Moderate Frequency, and Word Appearing Frequently. Nearly 800 pages and 24,000 words long, the Consolidated Word List is intended for those who have mastered the basics and already gone through Spell It!. Spelling bee participants in the United States also use other reference books and tutoring materials are becoming available on the web.

Vanuatu
One of the first spelling bee competitions in Vanuatu took place in August 2019. Six primary schools and 36 students on the main island of Vanuatu participated and competed for secondary school scholarships. The SHEFA education office and Peace Corps Volunteers collaborated to make the spelling bee possible.

In other languages
Hindi

ISB Spelling Bee international now has Spelling Bee in Hindi also. Hindi is the language most widely spoken in India and many countries where Indians reside..

Bangla

ISB Spelling Bee international now has Spelling Bee in Bengali also. Bengali is the 2nd most widely spoken language in India and many countries like Bangladesh also.

Dutch

From 1990 to 2016, the Dutch and Flemish organized a Dutch spelling bee every year, which was televised from 1991 onwards.

School spelling bees
Spelling bee students usually start competition in elementary school (primary school) or middle school. Classes compete against other classes in the same grade, or level, and the winning class is determined by the score of each class.  On an individual level, school spelling bees determine which child will represent his or her school at district, state and national competitions.

See also
 Chinese Characters Dictation Competition
 Dictation (exercise)
 Kanji Kentei
 Spelling alphabet

References

External links

History of Louisville, Kentucky